Bhadanwara is a village and Panchayat of five villages situated at the Tentigaon-Khair Road in Mant Tehsil of Mathura district, Uttar Pradesh. Bhadnwara Village is located 43 kilometers away from Mathura and only 26 kilometers from Khair city.

Geography 
Bhadanwara's pin code is 281205 and postal head office is Surir. It is only 2 km for the Surir and 5 kmfrom Taintgaon.

Education 
There is no institution for graduation. Students of the area goes to Khair and Mathura colleges for future studies.

Politics
Mant is the Vidhan Sabha constituency. Mathur a is the parliamentary constituency.

Transportation
Timely UPSRTC bus is available in morning and evening to Mathrua City and Delhi City.

A private bus service runs from Khair to Tentigaon every hour.

Personal vehicle use like bicycle, bulk cart, and camel cart are commonplace in the village. A private bus service also runs every 1 hour here.

Nearby cities and villages 
Bhadanwara is connected with two states cities Uttar Pradesh and Haryana as well Agra region and Aligarh region.

Villages
 Surir
 Bera, Mathura
 Kewat Nagla
 Bhidauni

References

 
 
Villages in Mathura district